The Grand Canal is a 1908 painting by Australian artist Arthur Streeton. The work depicts the Grand Canal in Venice as seen from a viewpoint on Ca' Foscari.

The work was acquired by Australian businessman Arthur Baillieu (father of arts patron Sunday Reed) in 1914. It later passed to his sister Amy Shackell and was subsequently privately held by her extended family; its whereabouts unknown to the broader art community. In 2018, the then head of the Hamilton Gallery, Sarah Schmidt "rediscovered" the painting in the family's private Western District home.

Streeton's contemporary, artist and gallery trustee Lionel Lindsay said of the painting: "Can I sufficiently acclaim it? All Streeton’s powers are here concentrated as in his Centre of Empire, his mastery of composition and atmospheric truth, the distinction of his colour and touch".

Schmidt described the work as "assuredly among Arthur Streeton’s very best, a glorious work capturing all of the splendor and beauty of Venice" and "the very pinnacle of Streeton’s Venetian series and indeed, of his extensive body of European work".

The painting sold at auction in April 2021 for AUD3,068,180 to a private buyer, at the time a record price for a Streeton work.

References

External links
Schmidt, Sarah (2019) A significant Streeton rediscovery: 'The Grand Canal' (1908) Art Monthly Australia

Paintings by Arthur Streeton
1908 paintings